The Switzerland women's national football team represents Switzerland in international women's football. The team played its first match in 1972.

Switzerland qualified for the 2015 FIFA Women's World Cup in Canada by winning their qualifying group. It was the first time that Switzerland participated in a women's World Cup, and the first time both the men's team and women's team qualified for a World Cup simultaneously.

At the 2015 FIFA Women's World Cup, Switzerland was drawn into Group C with Japan, Cameroon and Ecuador. They secured a 10–1 victory over Ecuador, but lost 1–0 to Japan and 2–1 to Cameroon. Switzerland finished third in their group, but they were one of the top four third-place finishers and advanced to the knockout round. In the Round of 16, Switzerland lost 1–0 to the hosts, Team Canada and were eliminated.

Switzerland qualified for the European Championship for the first time in 2017. They were placed in Group C alongside France, Austria and Iceland. They lost to Austria 1–0, but then rebounded to beat Iceland 2–1. Switzerland went into their final group match against France needing a win in order to advance to the knockout stage. Switzerland led for much of the match after Ana-Maria Crnogorčević scored in the 19th minute, but Camille Abily scored the equalizer for France in the 76th minute while the Blues were playing at a numerical disadvantage, and the match ended in a 1–1 draw, as a result Switzerland finished third in their group and did not advance.

At Euro 2022, Switzerland is again in Group C with Sweden, the Netherlands and Portugal as opponents. Switzerland left the competition in the first round, with a draw (2–2 against Portugal despite two goals scored in the first five minutes of the game) and two defeats against the favorites of the group (1–2 against Sweden and 1–4 against the Dutch title holders, having conceded the last three Dutch goals in the last 10 minutes of the game).

Switzerland has never qualified for the Olympic games.

History

Results and fixtures

 The following is a list of matches in the last 12 months, as well as any future matches that have been scheduled.

2022

2023

Coaching staff

Current coaching staff
The senior women's management team includes:

Manager history
  Jost Leuzinger (2000–2004)
  Béatrice von Siebenthal (2005–2012)
  Martina Voss-Tecklenburg (2012–2018)
  Nils Nielsen (2018–2022)
  Inka Grings (2022–)

Players

Current squad
The following 23 players were called up to the squad for UEFA Women's Euro 2022.

Caps and goals are correct as of 12 April 2022.

Head coach:  Nils Nielsen

Recent call-ups
 The following players have been named to a roster in the past 12 months.

This list may be incomplete.

Competitive record

FIFA Women's World Cup

*Draws include knockout matches decided on penalty kicks.

Match History

UEFA Women's Championship

*Draws include knockout matches decided on penalty kicks.

World Cup / Euro Qualifying match history

See also

Sport in Switzerland
Football in Switzerland
Women's football in Switzerland
Switzerland women's national under-20 football team
Switzerland women's national under-17 football team
Switzerland women's national beach soccer team

References

External links

Official website
FIFA profile

 
European women's national association football teams
1972 establishments in Switzerland